Nigeria ICT Fest (NIF) is an initiative to engender economic development in Nigeria by leveraging Information and Communications Technology (ICT). The event's goal is to help Nigeria brace up with emerging cutting edge technologies.

Activities

Nigeria ICT Fest serves as a platform for ICT initiatives in Nigeria and provides opportunities to network across borders.

Nigeria ICT Fest 2015 
According to an article on the institute for ethics and emerging technologies website, the first edition of Nigeria ICT Fest was held in December 2015 in Victoria Island, Lagos. Scientists such as Aubrey de Grey, James Hughes, Ben Goertzel and Natasha Vita-More spoke remotely (via Skype) at the event. Aubrey de Grey spoke on Rejuvenation Biotechnology: Undoing aging with regenerative medicine.

Micah Redding spoke on the first day, December 4 on the topic: "Christianity, Emerging Technologies, and the developing world — Nigeria's role in humanity's future." He challenged the view that Christians are not supposed to be actively involved in society, and advised that church should take advantage of technologies.

Mira Kwak, an Artificial intelligence researcher from Seoul Korea spoke on day 2, December 5, 2015 on how to be a leading country by and in ICT. She talked about culture and how Nigerian culture could be portrayed positively to the international community.

Publications
According to Ana Frunza, researcher at LUMEN Research Center in Social & Humanistic Sciences, LUMEN Research Center in Social & Humanistic Sciences announced their collaboration with  Mascot Information and Technology Solutions (MITS), Nigeria, the official organizer of the  Nigeria ICT Fest 2015 on November 30, 2015. In this collaboration, LUMEN Research Center is sponsoring the publication of the proceeding papers resulted from the scientific event Nigeria ICT Fest 2015.

References

Ethics of science and technology
Information technology in Nigeria
Economic development in Nigeria
21st century in Lagos
Events in Lagos